A list films produced in Pakistan in 1991 (see 1991 in film) and in the Urdu language:

1991

See also 
1991 in Pakistan

External links
 Search Pakistani film - IMDB.com

1991
Pakistani
Films